Ayyub may refer to:

Ayub (name), a given name
Ayyub (crater), an impact crater in the northern hemisphere of Saturn's moon Enceladus
Ayyub, Iran, a village in Kurdistan Province, Iran
Najm ad-Din Ayyub, full name Najm ad-Din Ayyub, founder of the Ayyubid dynasty
Job in Islam
Abu Ayyub al-Ansari, a companion (sahaba) of Muhammad
 Ayyub's Castle (from the Arabic Qalat 'Ayyūb), the original foundation of Calatayud, Province of Zaragoza, Aragón, Spain

See also
 Ayyubid dynasty, a Muslim dynasty of Kurdish origin